John Goville (born 5 January 1962) is a retired Ugandan sprinter who specialized in the 200 and 400 metres.

Govile finished seventh in 4 x 400 metres relay at the 1984 Summer Olympics, together with teammates Moses Kyeswa, Peter Rwamuhanda and Mike Okot, in a national record time of 3:02.09 minutes.

On the individual level he participated in 200 m at the 1984 Olympics and 400 m at the 1988 Olympics, both times without reaching the final. At the 1988 Olympics he also participated in 4 x 100 metres relay. He won the East and Central African Championships in 1983 and 1990. In 1984 and 1986 he won both 100 m, 200 m and 400 m at the Ugandan championships.

References

External links

1962 births
Living people
Ugandan male sprinters
Athletes (track and field) at the 1984 Summer Olympics
Athletes (track and field) at the 1988 Summer Olympics
Athletes (track and field) at the 1990 Commonwealth Games
Olympic athletes of Uganda
Commonwealth Games competitors for Uganda
20th-century Ugandan people
21st-century Ugandan people